Holiday Peak is a peak over  high standing between the lower ends of Miers Glacier and Adams Glacier in Victoria Land, Antarctica. It was so named by the New Zealand Victoria University of Wellington Antarctic Expedition, 1960–61, because of its prominent position overlooking the expedition's Christmas camp.

References

Mountains of Victoria Land
Scott Coast